CI Resources is an ASX listed company which operates the phosphate mine  and provides services to the Immigration Reception and Processing Centre on Christmas Island.

The company was established in 1987. The company owned a 63-percent share of Phosphate Resources Ltd. It was reported earlier 2015 that CI Resources will buy out Phosphate Resources, which has operated the mine on Christmas Island since 1990.

References

External links

Mining companies of Australia
Phosphate mines in Australia
Companies based in Western Australia
Non-renewable resource companies established in 1987
Companies listed on the Australian Securities Exchange